Videotape is a three-piece pop music project of Canadians Adam Saikaley, Nathan Gara and Ryan Patterson, based in Ottawa, Ontario, Canada.

History
Videotape was formed in Ottawa by three former members of As The Poets Affirm, after that band broke up in late 2007.

Videotape was listed on The Village Voice's Pazz & Jop 2008 charts. Their debut album, My Favourite Thing, was independently released in 2008, and appeared on the Canadian campus charts. It was later available for download. A single from the album Smiling Heads, was distributed through Zunior.

(Gara and Patterson are now based in Toronto) They are signed to Toronto record label, Bird & Flag.

Discography

Albums
 2008: My Favourite Thing  (Independent)

Compilation appearances
 2008: Coke Machine Glow 2008 Fantasy Podcast

References

External links
 Videotape Official website
 Videotape on MySpace
 Videotape on Facebook
 Videotape on CBC Radio 3
 Videotape on Bandcamp.com

Reviews and Press
 Coke Machine Glow review (August 2008)
 I Heart Music review (July 2008)
 Ottawa Citizen feature (March 2008)
 Ottawa XPress feature

Musical groups established in 2007
Musical groups from Ottawa
Canadian indie rock groups
2007 establishments in Ontario